Vökoder may refer to:
Tim Donst, the first professional wrestler working under the character of Vökoder.
Larry Sweeney, the second professional wrestler working under the character of Vökoder.